Matti Pärssinen (20 April 1896, in Pyhäjärvi Vpl – 21 April 1951) was a Finnish farmer and politician. He was a member of the Parliament of Finland from 1939 to 1948, representing the Agrarian League.

References

1896 births
1951 deaths
People from Priozersky District
People from Viipuri Province (Grand Duchy of Finland)
Centre Party (Finland) politicians
Members of the Parliament of Finland (1939–45)
Members of the Parliament of Finland (1945–48)
Finnish people of World War II